Noel Dolton (birth unknown), also known by the nickname "Tombstone", is an Australian former professional rugby league footballer who played in the 1950s and 1960s.

International honours

Playing career
Noel Dolton represented Commonwealth XIII while at Wakefield Trinity in 1965 against New Zealand at Crystal Palace National Recreation Centre, London on Wednesday 18 August 1965.

Club career
Noel Dolton made his debut for Wakefield Trinity during December 1964, and he played his last match for Wakefield Trinity during the 1965–66 season

References

External links
 (archived by web.archive.org) Statistics at stats.rleague.com
Newtown Withholds Transfer For Noel Dolton. By Alan Clarkson
Parramatta Prop Misses Training
Wests to seek Newtown Man
Search for "Noel Dolton" at britishnewspaperarchive.co.uk
Search for "Noel Dalton" at britishnewspaperarchive.co.uk

Living people
Australian rugby league players
Newtown Jets players
Parramatta Eels players
Place of birth missing (living people)
Rugby league props
Rugby league second-rows
Wakefield Trinity players
Western Suburbs Magpies players
Year of birth missing (living people)